Pasha Gademan (born 6 March 1988) is a Dutch field hockey coach of the Canadian national team.

He managed the Canadian team at the 2020 Summer Olympics.

References

External links

1988 births
Living people
Dutch expatriate sportspeople in Canada
Dutch field hockey coaches
Olympic coaches
Men's Hoofdklasse Hockey players